TattleTales is the second studio album by American rapper 6ix9ine. It was released on September 4, 2020. TattleTales is the follow-up to Dummy Boy, which was released shortly after 6ix9ine was arrested in November 2018. It features guest appearances from Akon, Nicki Minaj, Smilez, Leftside and DJ Akademiks.

Background
It is the first album by 6ix9ine since his release from prison following his cooperation with federal agents on a case involving his former fellow gang members of the Nine Trey Bloods. Upon his homecoming from prison, he released his first single of the album, "Gooba", on his birthday on May 8, 2020. His subsequent singles "Trollz", "Yaya" and "Punani" were released afterwards and "Trollz" became a number one hit in the United States.

Singles
"Gooba" was released on May 8, 2020 as the lead single for the album, following his release from prison due to the COVID-19 pandemic and finishing his sentence in house arrest. The single debuted and peaked at number three on the Billboard Hot 100.

The second single, "Trollz" featuring Nicki Minaj, was released a month after "Gooba" on June 12, 2020. The recording debuted atop the Billboard Hot 100, becoming 6ix9ine's first number-one single and Nicki's second, following "Say So" a month earlier. The song would also become the first song to reach number one under an independent label since XXXTentacion's song "Sad!" in 2018. 
The song later became the first number-one single to fall over 30 positions in its second week after its debut atop the Hot 100 chart.

"Yaya" was released on July 3, 2020 as the third single, where it reached number four on the US Hot Latin Songs Chart and number 99 on the Billboard Hot 100.

The fourth and final single, "Punani" (censored as P****i), was released on August 3, 2020. It peaked at number seven on the Bubbling Under Hot 100 Singles Chart.

Other songs
A music video for the song "Tutu" was released the same day as the album on September 4, 2020.

Commercial performance
TattleTales debuted at number  four on the US Billboard 200 with 53,000 album-equivalent units in its first week, becoming the rapper's third top-10 album. The album sold 32,000 copies in physicals and accumulated a total of 32.94 million on-demand streams of the set's tracks in the week ending September 19.

Track listing

Notes
 All song titles are stylized in all caps
 "Locked Up Pt. 2" contains samples of "Locked Up", written and performed by Akon.

Charts

References

2020 albums
6ix9ine albums